Anthony Camara (born September 4, 1993) is a Canadian professional ice hockey player. He is currently playing for HC Neftekhimik Nizhnekamsk of the Kontinental Hockey League (KHL). Camara was selected by the Boston Bruins in the 3rd round (81st overall) of the 2011 NHL Entry Draft.

Playing career
Camara played five seasons (2009–2013) of major junior hockey in the Ontario Hockey League (OHL) with the Saginaw Spirit and Barrie Colts, where he had a breakout year in 2012–13 scoring 36 goals and 24 assists in 50 games played.

Camara made his professional debut in the American Hockey League with the Providence Bruins during the 2013–14 season. In the second year of his contract with the Boston Bruins, Camara made the opening night roster, but was placed on injured reserve before opening night.

During the 2015–16 season, his third with the Providence Bruins, Camara was included in a trade at the NHL deadline by the Bruins, along with two draft picks to the Carolina Hurricanes in exchange for John-Michael Liles on February 29, 2016. He closed out the season with AHL affiliate, the Charlotte Checkers contributing with 8 points in 15 games.

Camara remained a free agent over the duration of the summer and into the 2016–17 season, before he belatedly signed an ECHL contract with the Kalamazoo Wings on November 4, 2016. In a leading offensive role for the K-Wings, Camara responded with 17 points in 25 games before returning to the AHL in agreeing to a professional try-out deal with the St. John's IceCaps on January 5, 2017.

As an un-signed free agent approaching the 2017–18 season, Camara signed his first contract abroad in agreeing to a one-year deal with Danish club, Odense Bulldogs of the Metal Ligaen on August 1, 2017. Camara scored 37 points in 27 games before moving to the EBEL with Graz 99ers before completing the season with German outfit, Iserlohn Roosters of the Deutsche Eishockey Liga (DEL).

Following a successful 2018–19 season with the Roosters, compiling a professional personal high with 23 goals and 43 points in 50 games, Camara gained interest as a free agent from the Swedish Hockey League, agreeing to a one-year contract with HV71 on April 20, 2019.

In the following 2019–20 season, Camara quickly adapted to the SHL and was among HV71 top regular season scorers. On February 6, 2020, he was signed to a two-year contract extension with HV71 through 2022. However on March 5, 2020, despite amassing 11 goals and 26 points through 42 regular season games, Camara's contract with HV71 was immediately terminated after a disciplinary matter.

Prior to the 2020–21 season, Camara was signed by HC Dynamo Pardubice of the Czech Extraliga.

Following two seasons in Czechia, Camara continued his journeyman career in agreeing to a one-year contract with Russian club, HC Neftekhimik Nizhnekamsk of the KHL on June 21, 2022.

Career statistics

Regular season and playoffs

International

References

External links

1993 births
Living people
Barrie Colts players
Boston Bruins draft picks
Canadian ice hockey left wingers
Charlotte Checkers (2010–) players
HC Dynamo Pardubice players
Graz 99ers players
HV71 players
Iserlohn Roosters players
Kalamazoo Wings (ECHL) players
HC Neftekhimik Nizhnekamsk players
Odense Bulldogs players
Providence Bruins players
Saginaw Spirit players
St. John's IceCaps players
Ice hockey people from Toronto
Canadian expatriate ice hockey players in Austria
Canadian expatriate ice hockey players in Denmark
Canadian expatriate ice hockey players in Germany
Canadian expatriate ice hockey players in the United States
Canadian expatriate ice hockey players in the Czech Republic
Canadian expatriate ice hockey players in Sweden
Canadian expatriate ice hockey players in Russia